"Tantum ergo" is the incipit of the last two verses of Pange lingua, a Medieval Latin hymn generally attributed to St Thomas Aquinas c. 1264, but based by Aquinas upon various earlier fragments. The "Genitori genitoque" and "Procedenti ab utroque" portions are adapted from Adam of Saint Victor's sequence for Pentecost. The hymn's Latin incipit literally translates to "Therefore so great".

The singing of the Tantum ergo occurs during veneration and benediction of the Blessed Sacrament in the Catholic Church and other denominations that have this devotion. It is usually sung, though solemn recitation is sometimes done, and permitted.

Text

Latin  
{| 
|-
|Tantum ergo sacramentumVeneremur cernui,et antiquum documentumnovo cedat ritui.Præstet fides supplementumsensuum defectui.
|-
|Genitori genitoquelaus et jubilatio,Salus, honor, virtus quoquesit et benedictio!Procedenti ab utroquecompar sit laudatio!Amen.
|}

℣. Panem de cælis præstitisti eis (in Paschaltide and on Corpus Christi, 'Alleluia' is added).
℟. Omne delectamentum in se habentem[Wis 16:20] (in Paschaltide and on Corpus Christi, 'Alleluia' is added).

℣. Oremus: Deus, qui nobis sub sacramento mirabili passionis tuæ memoriam reliquisti: tribue, quæsumus, ita nos corporis et sanguinis tui sacra mysteria venerari, ut redemptionis tuæ fructum in nobis jugiter sentiamus. Qui vivis et regnas in saecula saeculorum.

℟. Amen.

Literal translation 
Therefore, so greatly the Sacrament
Let us venerate with heads bowed [cernui]
And let the old practice [documentum]
Give way to the new rite;
Let faith provide a supplement
For the failure of the senses.

To the Begetter and the Begotten [both masculine gender],
Be praise and jubilation,
Hail, honour, virtue also,
And blessing too:
To the One proceeding from Both
Let there be equal praise.

Amen.

℣. You have provided them bread from heaven.
℟. Having in itself [in se] all delight [delectamentum].

℣. Let us pray: O God, who to us in this wonderful Sacrament, bequeathed a memorial of Your Passion: grant, we beseech, that we, in worshipping [venerari; in addition to simple worship, may also mean worshipping in order to receive favour] the Holy Mysteries of Your Body and Blood, may within ourselves continually [iugiter], sensibly perceive [sentiamus] the fruit of Your redemption. You who live and reign into ages of ages.

℟. Amen.

English translation 
A century-old translation, still used in Catholic churches liturgically, renders the hymn in a form which can be sung to the same tune as the Latin:

Down in adoration falling,
Lo! the Sacred Host we hail,
Lo! o'er ancient forms departing
Newer rites of grace prevail;
Faith for all defects supplying,
Where the feeble senses fail.

To the Everlasting Father,
And the Son Who reigns on high
With the Holy Ghost proceeding
Forth from Each eternally,
Be salvation, honour, blessing,
Might, and endless majesty.

Amen.

℣. Thou hast given them bread from heaven.
℟. Having within it all sweetness.

℣. Let us pray: O God, who in this wonderful Sacrament left us a memorial of Thy Passion: grant, we implore Thee, that we may so venerate the Sacred Mysteries of Thy Body and Blood, as always to be conscious of the fruit of Thy Redemption. Thou who livest and reignest forever and ever.

℟. Amen.

Other, more modern, English translations exist and are also used in Catholic churches liturgically.

Theological aspects 
The words "procedenti ab utroque / compar sit laudatio"—literally, "May equal praise be to the One proceeding from both"—refer to the Holy Spirit, which according to version of the Nicene Creed used in Western Christianity proceeds from both the father and the son. 

A partial indulgence is granted to the faithful who devoutly recite the Tantum ergo. But a plenary indulgence is granted on Holy Thursday and on the feast of Corpus Christi, if it is recited in a solemn manner.

Musical settings 
The basic text has been set by numerous composers from the Renaissance (Palestrina), the Romantic period (Anton Bruckner, Gabriel Fauré, Franz Schubert, Louis Vierne), and modern composers (Maurice Duruflé, David Conte).

Déodat de Séverac composed a motet set to the text.

Bruckner wrote eight settings of the text: WAB 32, WAB 43, WAB 41 (Nos. 1, 2, 3, 4), WAB 42, and WAB 44. Fauré wrote two settings: Op. 55, and Op. 62 No. 2. Schubert wrote six settings: D. 460, D. 461, D. 730, D. 739 (Op. 45), D. 750, and D. 962. Vierne's treatment of it is his Opus 2. Duruflé's setting is contained as No. 4 of his Op. 10, Quatre Motets sur des thèmes grégoriens, published in 1960, and uses the plainchant melody.

Samuel Webbe composed a motet in 87 87 meter, widely used in the English and American Catholic churches.

Philippine use 
The Church in the Philippines uses a separate hymn tune [another video] from the Pange lingua, whose first three strophes are otherwise sung to the melody used elsewhere. This particular tune, which is of Spanish origin, is credited to a "J. Carreras" and was originally published with a time signature of  but is now sung in quadruple metre in Luzon and in quadruple then triple metre in the Visayas.

Let Us Raise Our Voice 
This tune is also used to sing "Let Us Raise Our Voice", a loose English adaptation of the Tantum ergo. The hymn, whose lyrics paraphrase the first two forms of the Memorial Acclamation of the Mass, is sung during the Wednesday Novena Service to Our Lady of Perpetual Help and Benediction at Baclaran Church (the icon's principal shrine in the country).

Let us raise our voice to proclaim our Faith:
Christ the Lord, for us has died;
Dying, He destroyed our death,
Rising, He restored our life.
O Lord Jesus, we await
Your last return in glory.

When we eat the bread and we drink the cup
In the blessed Eucharist
We meet You, our Risen Saviour,
Giving life to us anew.
Through life’s journey be with us,
To strengthen us forever.

Amen, Amen.

℣. You have given them bread from heaven [Alleluia].
℟. The source of all happiness [Alleluia].

℣. Let us pray: Lord God, by the Paschal Mystery of the Death and Resurrection of Your only Son, You accomplish the work of man’s redemption. Full of trust, we proclaim the Paschal Mystery in the sacramental signs of the Eucharist. Help us to see ever growing in us the fruits of Your saving work; through Christ Our Lord.

℟. Amen.

References

External links
 
 

Eucharistic devotions
Latin-language Christian hymns
13th-century hymns